The Seattle Washington Temple (formerly the Seattle Temple) is the 21st constructed and 19th operating temple of the Church of Jesus Christ of Latter-day Saints (LDS Church). Located in the city of Bellevue, east of Seattle, it was the first to be built in the state of Washington. The temple has a modern single-spire design.

Due to its proximity to the Bellevue Airfield, the proposed height of the spire was reduced, and a red strobe warning light was installed at the base of the angel Moroni statue. The airfield closed in 1983, and the light was shut off.

History
The intention to construct the Seattle Temple was announced on November 15, 1975, and it was dedicated five years later on November 17, 1980, by church president Spencer W. Kimball.

In 2020, the Seattle Washington Temple was closed in response to the coronavirus pandemic.

See also

 The Church of Jesus Christ of Latter-day Saints in Washington
 Royden G. Derrick, a former temple president
 Comparison of temples of The Church of Jesus Christ of Latter-day Saints
 List of temples of The Church of Jesus Christ of Latter-day Saints
 List of temples of The Church of Jesus Christ of Latter-day Saints by geographic region
 Temple architecture (Latter-day Saints)

References

External links
 
 Seattle Washington Temple Official site
 Seattle Washington Temple at ChurchofJesusChristTemples.org
  Seattle Washington Temple page with interior photos

20th-century Latter Day Saint temples
Buildings and structures in Bellevue, Washington
The Church of Jesus Christ of Latter-day Saints in Washington (state)
Religious buildings and structures in Washington (state)
Religious buildings and structures completed in 1980
Temples (LDS Church) in the United States
1980 establishments in Washington (state)
Christianity in Washington (state)
Religious buildings and structures in Seattle